Events from the year 1999 in Belgium

Incumbents
Monarch: Albert II
Prime Minister: Jean-Luc Dehaene (to 12 July); Guy Verhofstadt (from 12 July)

Events
 May – Dioxin affair comes to light
 13 June – 1999 Belgian federal election
 12 July – Verhofstadt I Government sworn in
 2 August – Yaguine Koita and Fodé Tounkara discovered dead at Brussels Airport
 4 December – Wedding of Prince Philippe and Mathilde d'Udekem d'Acoz

Publications
 Amélie Nothomb, Stupeur et tremblements (winner of the 1999 Grand Prix du roman de l'Académie française)
 Philippe Roberts-Jones, Brussels: Fin de Siècle (Cologne: Taschen)
 Robert Stallaerts, Historical Dictionary of Belgium (Lanham, Md.: Scarecrow Press)
 Raymond van Uytven, Studies over Brabantse kloostergeschiedenis (Brussels: Algemeen Rijksarchief, 1999)

Births
 2 August – Emma Bale, singer
 27 August – Mile Svilar, footballer

Deaths
 22 January – Paul Cammermans (born 1921), film maker
 20 February – Frans Grootjans (born 1922), politician
 16 August – Paul Serruys (born 1912), missionary
 10 September – Michèle Fabien (born 1945), writer
 17 December – Henri Storck (born 1907), film maker

References

 
Belgium
Years of the 20th century in Belgium
1990s in Belgium
Belgium